Hounsh Munshi (born September 12, 1993) is an Indian former figure skater. She is the 2007-2008 season Indian bronze medalist. Her family is from India, and Munshi has also lived in Sydney, Australia, before moving with her family to the United States. She was coached by Tiffany Chin.

References

External links
 photo of Munshi
 

1993 births
Living people
Hounsh Munshi
People from Cerritos, California
Indian female single skaters
Indian emigrants to the United States